Cynara is an American pre-Code 1932 romantic drama film about a British lawyer who pays a heavy price for an affair. It stars Ronald Colman, Kay Francis, and Phyllis Barry. It is based on the 1928 novel An Imperfect Lover by Robert Gore-Browne. In February 2020, the film was shown at the 70th Berlin International Film Festival, as part of a retrospective dedicated to King Vidor's career. A text panel at the beginning of the film explains the title: “Inspired by Ernest Dowson's immortal lines—‘I have been faithful to thee, Cynara, in my fashion.” The poem in question, Non Sum Qualis eram Bonae Sub Regno Cynarae, was first published in 1894.

Plot 
In Naples, disgraced London barrister James "Jim" Warlock prepares to part from his beloved wife Clemency and start anew in South Africa. When she asks him to explain the events leading to his downfall, a flashback ensues.

Hard-working, successful, and deeply in love, Jim is looking forward to his seventh wedding anniversary. His friend John Tring thinks Jim needs “color” in his life and laughs at him for being "the last of the virtuous men". Jim is crestfallen when Clemency informs him that she has to take her sister Garla to Venice for a month to get her away from a parachute jumper, the latest in a string of unsuitable men with whom she has fallen in love.

While the women are away, Tring takes his friend out to dine.  At the restaurant, a young shopgirl named Doris Lea in the next booth dons Jim's bowler hat on a dare from her friend and flatmate Milly Miles. Tring is enchanted, and persuades the reluctant Jim to join the girls. Doris takes a great liking to Jim and gives him her address. Later, he tears up the slip of paper.

Tring has other ideas. He arranges for Jim to judge a swimsuit contest and informs Doris, who becomes a contestant. Jim names her the winner. When she slips and injures her ankle, he picks her up and takes her back to her flat. There, he warns her that he is married and that nothing good can come of their relationship. She tells him that she will not cause trouble when he wishes to end it. They embark on an idyllic affair.

However, when Clemency, Garla, and Garla's new Italian fiancé finally return, Doris finds it impossible to give up the man she loves. Finally, Jim writes her a letter telling her he cannot see her anymore. She responds by committing suicide.

The letter is found, and Jim is forced to testify at the inquest. When the coroner asks if Doris had any prior relationships, Jim protects her privacy and refuses to answer, even though she told him of an earlier liaison. Jim is guilty of no criminal offence, but the scandal destroys his promising career.

The flashback ends. After Jim leaves to board his ocean liner, Tring comes to talk to Clemency. He accepts a share of the blame for what happened, and he reminds Clemency that she may never see Jim again. She rushes to the ship to join her husband.

Cast
 Ronald Colman as Jim Warlock
 Kay Francis as Clemency Warlock
 Phyllis Barry as Doris Emily Lea
 Henry Stephenson as John Tring
 Viva Tattersall as Milly Miles
 Florine McKinney as Gorla
 Clarissa Selwynne as Onslow
 Paul Porcasi as Joseph, Maitre d'
 George Kirby as Mr Boots, MC of the swimsuit competition
 Donald Stuart as Henry
 Wilson Benge as Merton, Jim's valet
 Halliwell Hobbes as Coroner

References

External links
 
 
 
 

1932 films
1932 romantic drama films
American romantic drama films
American black-and-white films
1930s English-language films
Films about infidelity
Films about suicide
Films based on British novels
Films directed by King Vidor
Films scored by Alfred Newman
Films set in London
Films set in Naples
Films set in Venice
Samuel Goldwyn Productions films
United Artists films
1930s American films